Serafim da Araújo Vieira (born 7 November 1966) is a Portuguese former road cyclist. Professional from 1986 to 1997, he most notably won the Portuguese National Road Race Championships in 1987 and 1988. He also rode in seven editions of the Vuelta a España as well as in the 1995 Giro d'Italia.

Major results

1986
 10th Overall Troféu Joaquim Agostinho
1987
 1st  Road race, National Road Championships
 1st Stages 4b, 9 & 14 Volta a Portugal
 1st Stage 3 Grande Prémio Jornal de Notícias
 1st Stages 1a & 1b GP Costa Azul
 1st Stage 8 Troféu Joaquim Agostinho
1988
 1st  Road race, National Road Championships
 6th Overall Volta ao Algarve
1989
 4th Overall Volta ao Algarve
1st Stages 2 & 3
 4th Overall Troféu Joaquim Agostinho
1995
 3rd Road race, National Road Championships

Grand Tour general classification results timeline

References

External links

1966 births
Living people
Portuguese male cyclists
People from Marco de Canaveses
Sportspeople from Porto District